"She's the One" is a rhythm and blues song written by Hank Ballard and first recorded by his group The Midnighters. Originally issued on Federal Records as the B-side of their #1 R&B hit "Annie Had a Baby", it received an A-side release (Federal 12205) later the same year.

Ike & Tina Turner recorded a version of the song, retitled "He's the One" which was released as a single in 1964 and included on the 2000 compilation album The Kent Years. Marva Whitney recorded a version of "He's the One", for her James Brown-produced 1969 album It's My Thing. Her version was released as a single the following year. Brown himself recorded the song around the same time, but his version remained unreleased until 1988, when it was issued as a single in the United Kingdom and charted #45 there. It also appeared on the compilation album Motherlode, released the same year.

References

Hank Ballard songs
The Midnighters songs
James Brown songs
Songs written by Hank Ballard
1954 songs
1970 singles
1988 singles

Ike & Tina Turner songs
1964 singles
Kent Records singles
King Records (United States) singles